The 2012–13 Detroit Red Wings season was the 87th season for the National Hockey League (NHL) franchise that was established on September 25, 1926. The regular season was reduced from its usual 82 games to 48 due to a lockout. This was the first time in a long time that the Red Wings did not have Nicklas Lidstrom on their roster, lost to retirement. Henrik Zetterberg was appointed as team captain.

Off-season
On May 31, 2012, defenseman Nicklas Lidstrom announced his retirement from the NHL after 20 seasons. Lidstrom won four Stanley Cups and seven Norris Trophies during his Hall of Fame career, all with the Red Wings.

Regular season

Schedule and results

Playoffs

Player statistics

Skaters

Goaltenders

Goaltenders

†Denotes player spent time with another team before joining the Red Wings. Stats reflect time with the Red Wings only.
‡Traded mid-season
Bold/italics denotes franchise record

Awards and records

Awards

Records 
24 consecutive home wins

Milestones

Transactions
The Red Wings have been involved in the following transactions during the 2012–13 season.

Trades

Free agents signed

Free agents lost

Lost via waivers

Lost via retirement

Player signings

Draft picks 

The Detroit Red Wings' picks at the 2012 NHL Entry Draft, held in Pittsburgh, Pennsylvania on June 22 & 23, 2012.

Draft notes
 The Red Wings' first-round pick went to the Tampa Bay Lightning as the result of a February 21, 2012, trade that sent Kyle Quincey to the Red Wings in exchange for Sebastien Piche and this pick.

See also 
 2012–13 NHL season

References

Detroit Red Wings seasons
Detroit Red Wings season, 2012-13
Detroit
Detroit Red
Detroit Red